is a Netflix original romantic comedy series about a thirty-something rom-com screenwriter, Rio Yazaki, who manipulates four love-sick women for their stories under the guise of giving them romantic advice.

Season 1 of The Many Faces of Ito premiered on August 11, 2017. The series is based on the book "Ito-Kun A to E" by Japanese author Asako Yuzuki.

Cast
 Fumino Kimura as Rio Yazaki (E)
 Nozomi Sasaki as Tomomi Shimahara (A)
 Mirai Shida as Shūko Nose (B)
 Elaiza Ikeda as Satoko Aida (C)
 Kaho as Miki Jinbo (D)
 Yuki Yamada as Okita
 Tomoya Nakamura as Kentarō Kuzumi
 Rio Yamashita as Maki Miyata
 Kei Tanaka as Shin'ya Tamura
 Masaki Okada as Seijirō Ito

References

Japanese-language Netflix original programming
2017 Japanese television series debuts